The South Bronx is an area of the New York City borough of the Bronx. The area comprises neighborhoods in the southern part of the Bronx, such as Concourse, Mott Haven, Melrose, and Port Morris.

In the early 1900s, the South Bronx was originally known as the Manor of Morrisania, as it was the manor of Lewis Morris. As the Morris family continued to expand on the land, an influx of German and Irish immigrants started to populate the area, leading the Bronx to be considered the "Jewish Borough" in the 1930s. This soon changed as World War II caused rent to increase in many apartments, pushing people out. By the end of the 1950s, the South Bronx was two-thirds African American or Hispanic (of any race).

The South Bronx is known for its hip hop culture and graffiti. Graffiti became popular in the Bronx in the early 1970s, spreading through the New York City Subway system. The South Bronx then became musically notable as hip-hop music, rap, and other creative components started becoming common within the borough.

Boundaries

The geographic definitions of the South Bronx have evolved and are disputed but certainly include the neighborhoods of Mott Haven, Melrose and Port Morris. Originally referring to the industrial area below East 138th Street, the name "South Bronx" symbolically has had its northern boundary shift northward to East 149th Street, East 161st Street, the Cross Bronx Expressway, and Fordham Road over the years. The neighborhoods of Belmont, Castle Hill, Parkchester, Crotona Park East, Highbridge, Hunts Point, Longwood, Morrisania and Soundview are sometimes considered part of the South Bronx.

The South Bronx is part of New York's 15th Congressional District. The South Bronx is served by the NYPD's 40th, 41st, 42nd, 44th, and 48th Precincts.

History 

The South Bronx was originally called the Manor of Morrisania, and later Morrisania.  It was the private domain of the powerful and aristocratic Morris family, which includes Lewis Morris, signer of the Declaration of Independence, and Gouverneur Morris, the penman of the United States Constitution. The Morris memorial is at St. Ann's Church of Morrisania. Morris' descendants own land in the South Bronx to this day.

As the Morrises developed their landholdings, an influx of German and Irish immigrants populated the area.  Later, the Bronx was considered the "Jewish Borough," and at its peak in 1930 was 49% Jewish. Jews in the South Bronx numbered 364,000 or 57.1% of the total population in the area. The term was first coined in the 1940s by a group of social workers who identified the Bronx's first pocket of poverty, in the Port Morris section, the southernmost section of the Bronx.

1950s: Demographic shift 
After World War II, as white flight accelerated and migration of ethnic and racial minorities continued, the South Bronx went from being two-thirds non-Hispanic white in 1950 to being two-thirds black or Puerto Rican in 1960. Originally denoting only Mott Haven and Melrose, the South Bronx extended up to the Cross Bronx Expressway by the 1960s, encompassing Hunts Point, Morrisania, and Highbridge.

1960s: Start of decay 

The South Bronx was populated largely by working-class families. Its image as a poverty-ridden area developed in the latter part of the 20th century. There were several factors contributing to the decay of the South Bronx: white flight, landlord abandonment, economic changes, crime, demographics and also the construction of the Cross Bronx Expressway.

The Cross Bronx Expressway, completed in 1963, was a part of Robert Moses’s urban renewal project for New York City. The expressway is now known to have been a factor in the extreme urban decay seen by the borough in the 1970s and 1980s. Cutting through the heart of the South Bronx, the highway displaced thousands of residents from their homes, as well as several local businesses. The neighborhood of East Tremont, in particular, was completely destroyed by the Expressway. Others have argued that the construction of such highways has not harmed communities.

The already poor and working-class neighborhoods were further disadvantaged by the decreasing property value, in combination with increasing vacancy rates. Racially-charged tensions (coinciding with the  Civil Rights Movement) further contributed to middle-class flight and the decline of many South Bronx neighborhoods. Following the implementation of desegregation busing policies, parents who worried about their children attending the demographically-adjusted schools began to relocate to the suburbs, where de facto segregation often persisted via restrictive housing covenants, selective lending and redlining. 

As early as the late 1960s, some neighborhoods were considered undesirable by homeowners, precipitating a population decline. Postwar rent control policies have also been proposed by one author as a contributing factor; in this milieu, building owners had little motivation to keep up their properties. 

New York City Mayor John Lindsay (who served from 1966 to 1973) suggested that socioeconomic factors (including low educational attainment and high unemployment) limited housing options for the remaining low-income tenants, prompting the reduced upkeep by landlords. In either case, while desirable housing options were scarce, vacancies further increased. In the late 1960s, by the time the city decided to consolidate welfare households in the South Bronx, its vacancy rate was already the highest of any place in the city.

1970s: "The Bronx is burning" 

By the 1970s, significant poverty reached as far north as Fordham Road. Around this time, the Bronx experienced some of its worst instances of urban decay, with the loss of 300,000 residents and the destruction of entire city blocks' worth of buildings. The media attention brought the South Bronx into common parlance nationwide.

The phrase "The Bronx is burning," attributed to Howard Cosell during Game 2 of the 1977 World Series featuring the New York Yankees and Los Angeles Dodgers, refers to the arson epidemic caused by the total economic collapse of the South Bronx during the 1970s. During the game, as ABC switched to a generic helicopter shot of the exterior of Yankee Stadium, an uncontrolled fire could clearly be seen burning in the ravaged South Bronx surrounding the park. Many believe Cosell intoned, "There it is, ladies and gentlemen, the Bronx is burning." 

Review of the game footage shows that he did not say this. According to the New York Post, the words used by the two broadcasters during the game were later "spun by credulous journalists" into the now ubiquitous phrase "Ladies and gentlemen, the Bronx is burning" without either of the two announcers actually having phrased it that way.

The early 1970s saw South Bronx property values continue to plummet to record lows. A progressively vicious cycle began where large numbers of tenements and multi-story, multi-family apartment buildings, left vacant by White flight, sat abandoned and unsaleable for long periods of time, which, coupled with a stagnant economy and an extremely high unemployment rate, produced a strong attraction for criminal elements such as street gangs, which were exploding in number and beginning to support themselves with large-scale drug dealing in the area. The abandoned property also attracted large numbers of squatters such as the poor and marginalized, drug addicts and the mentally ill, who further lowered the borough's quality of living.

As the crisis deepened, the nearly bankrupt city government of Abraham Beame placed most of the blame on unreasonably high rents levied by landlords. He began demanding they convert their rapidly emptying buildings into Section 8 housing. Section 8 paid a per capita stipend for low-income or indigent tenants from Federal HUD funds rather than from the cash-strapped city coffers. However, the HUD rate was not based on the property's actual value and was set so low by the city, it left little opportunity or incentive for honest landlords to maintain or improve their buildings while still making a profit.

The result was a disastrous acceleration of both the speed and northward spread of the cycle of decay in the South Bronx as formerly desirable and well-maintained middle-to-upper class apartments in midtown, most notably along the Grand Concourse, were progressively vacated by White flight and either abandoned altogether or converted into federally funded single room occupancy "welfare hotels" run by absentee slumlords.

The massive citywide spending cuts also left the few remaining building inspectors and fire marshals unable to enforce living standards or punish code violations. This encouraged slumlords and absentee landlords to neglect and ignore their property and allowed for gangs to set up protected enclaves and lay claim to entire buildings. This then spread crime and fear of crime to nearby unaffected apartments in a domino effect.

Police statistics show that as the crime wave moved north across the Bronx, the remaining White tenants in the South Bronx (mostly elderly Jews) were preferentially targeted for violent crime by the influx of young, minority criminals because they were seen as easy prey. This became so common that the street slang terms "crib job" (meaning how elderly residents were as helpless as infants) and "push in" (meaning what would now be called a home invasion robbery) were coined specifically in reference to them.

Property owners who had waited too long to try to sell their buildings found that almost all of the property in the South Bronx had already been redlined by the banks and insurance companies. Unable to sell their property at any price and facing default on back property taxes and mortgages, landlords began to burn their buildings for their insurance value. A type of sophisticated white collar criminal known as a "fixer" sprung up during this period, specializing in a form of insurance fraud that began with buying out the property of redlined landlords at or below cost, then selling and reselling the buildings multiple times on paper between several different fictitious shell companies under the fixer's control, artificially driving up the value incrementally each time.

Fraudulent "no questions asked" fire insurance policies would then be taken out on the overvalued buildings and the property stripped and burnt for the payoff. This scheme became so common that local gangs were hired by fixers for their expertise at the process of stripping buildings of wiring, plumbing, metal fixtures, and anything else of value and then effectively burning it down with gasoline. Many finishers became extremely rich buying properties from struggling landlords, artificially driving up the value, insuring them and then burning them.

Often, the properties were still occupied by subsidized tenants or squatters at the time, who were given short or no warning before the building was burnt down. They were forced to move to another slum building, where the process would usually repeat itself. The rate of unsolved fatalities due to fire multiplied sevenfold in the South Bronx during the 1970s, with many residents reporting being burnt out of numerous apartment blocks one after the other.

Other fires were caused by unsafe electrical wiring, fires set indoors for heating, and random vandalism associated with the general crime situation.

Flawed HUD and city policies also encouraged local South Bronx residents to burn down their own buildings. Under the regulations, Section 8 tenants who were burned out of their current housing were granted immediate priority status for another apartment, potentially in a better part of the city. After the establishment of the (then) state-of-the-art Co-op City, there was a spike in fires as tenants began burning down their Section 8 housing in an attempt to jump to the front of the 2–3 year long waiting list for the new units. 

HUD regulations also authorized lump-sum aid payments of up to $1000 to those who could prove they had lost property due to a fire in their Section 8 housing; although these payments were supposed to be investigated for fraud by a HUD employee before being signed off on, very little investigation was done and some HUD employees and social services workers were accused of turning a blind eye to suspicious fires or even advising tenants on the best way to take advantage of the HUD policies. On multiple occasions, firefighters were reported to have shown up to tenement fires only to find all the residents at an address waiting calmly with their possessions already on the curb.

By the time of Cosell's 1977 commentary, dozens of buildings were being burnt in the South Bronx every day, sometimes whole blocks at a time and usually far more than the fire department could keep up with, leaving the area perpetually blanketed in a pall of smoke. Firefighters from the period reported responding to as many as 7 fully involved structure fires in a single shift, too many to even bother returning to the station house between calls (Report from Engine Company 82). The local police precincts—already struggling and failing to contain the massive wave of drug and gang crime invading the Bronx—had long since stopped bothering to investigate the fires, as there were simply too many to track. 

During this period, the NYPD's 41st Precinct station house at 1086 Simpson Street became famously known as "Fort Apache, The Bronx" as it struggled to deal with the overwhelming surge of violent crime, which for the entirety of the 1970s and 1980s made South Bronx the murder, rape, robbery, aggravated assault and arson capital of America. By 1980, the 41st Precinct was renamed the "Little House on the Prairie", as fully  of the 94,000 residents originally served by the precinct had fled, leaving the fortified building as one of the few structures in the neighborhood (and the sole building on Simpson Street) that had not been abandoned or burnt out.

In total, over 40% of the South Bronx was burned or abandoned between 1970 and 1980, with 44 census tracts losing more than 50% and seven more than 97% of their buildings to arson, abandonment, or both. The appearance was frequently compared to that of a bombed-out and evacuated European city following World War II. 

On October 5, 1977, U.S. President Jimmy Carter paid an unscheduled visit to Charlotte Street while in New York City for a conference at the headquarters of the United Nations. Charlotte Street at the time was a three-block devastated area of vacant lots and burned-out and abandoned buildings. The street had been so ravaged that part of it had been taken off official city maps in 1974. Carter instructed Patricia Roberts Harris, head of the U.S. Department of Housing and Urban Development, to take steps to salvage the area. 

Progress did not come quickly. Three years later, in 1980, presidential candidate Ronald Reagan paid a visit to Charlotte Street, declaring that he had not "seen anything that looked like this since London after the Blitz". The 1987 novel The Bonfire of the Vanities, by the American writer Tom Wolfe, presented the South Bronx as a nightmare world, not to be entered by middle or upper-class whites.

The PBS documentary show Independent Lens released an episode titled "Decade of Fire" on May 3, 2019. The episode was previewed at the Full Frame Film Festival the previous month.

Revitalization and current concerns 

Primarily beginning in the 1980s, parts of the South Bronx started to experience urban renewal with rehabilitated and new residential structures, including subsidized multifamily townhomes and apartment buildings. Between 1986 and 1994 over $1 billion were spent on rebuilding the area, with 19,000 apartments refurbished and more than 4,500 new houses built for the working class. More than fifty abandoned apartment buildings on the Major Deegan Expressway and the Cross Bronx Expressway were renovated for residential use. Over 26,500 people moved into the area. On Charlotte Street, prefabricated ranch-style houses were built in the area in 1985, and the area changed so significantly that a Bronx borough historian (Lloyd Ultan) could not locate where Carter had stopped to survey the scene. As of 2004, houses on the street were worth up to a million dollars.

The Bronx County Courthouse has secured landmark status, and efforts are underway to do the same for much of the Grand Concourse, in recognition of the area's Art Deco architecture. In June 2010, the city Landmarks Preservation Commission gave consideration to the establishment of a historic district on the Grand Concourse from 153rd to 167th Street. A final decision was expected in the coming months.

Construction of the new Yankee Stadium has stirred controversy over plans which, along with the new billion-dollar field, include new athletic fields, tennis courts, bicycle and walking paths, stores, restaurants, and a new Metro-North Railroad station at East 153rd Street. During baseball season, the station helps ease overcrowding on the subway.

There is hope that these developments also will help to generate residential construction. In April 2012, Heritage Field, a $50.8 million ballpark, was built atop the grounds of the original Yankee Stadium. The population of the South Bronx is currently increasing.

Despite significant investment compared to the post war period, many exacerbated social problems remain including high rates of violent crime, substance abuse, and overcrowded and substandard housing conditions. Its precincts have recorded high violent crime rates and are all considered to be New York City Police Department "impact zones." The Bronx contains the highest rate of poverty in New York City, and the greater South Bronx is the poorest area.

Arts and culture 

Since the late 1970s, the South Bronx has been home to a renewed grassroots art scene. The arts scene that sprouted at the Fashion Moda Gallery, founded by a Viennese artist, Stefan Eins, helped ignite the careers of artists like Keith Haring and Jenny Holzer, and 1980s break dancers like the Rock Steady Crew. It generated enough enthusiasm in the mainstream media for a short while to draw the art world's attention. The Bronx Academy of Arts and Dance was located in the American Bank Note Company Building in the South Bronx neighborhood of Hunts Point before relocating to St. Peter's Episcopal Church in Westchester Square.

Modern graffiti is prominent in the South Bronx, and is home to many of the fathers of graffiti art such as Tats Cru. The Bronx has a very strong graffiti scene despite the city's crackdown on illegal graffiti. However, graffiti in the Bronx began to occur in the early 1970s and managed to travel to different boroughs via the New York City Subway system.  The rise of hip-hop music, rap, breakdancing, and disc jockeying helped put the South Bronx on the musical map in the late 1970s. The South Bronx is also known worldwide as the birthplace of hip-hop culture.  In addition, the Bronx Museum of the Arts is located on the Grand Concourse.

Hip hop's birthplace 

Hip hop is a broad conglomerate of artistic forms that originated as a specific street subculture within South Bronx communities during the 1970s in New York City. Hip hop as music and culture formed during the 1970s when block parties became increasingly popular in New York City, particularly among African American and Latin Americans residing in the Bronx. Block parties incorporated DJs who played popular genres of music, especially funk and soul music. For example, many DJs played music by the artist James Brown. Some songs played at these South Bronx house parties included "Give it Up or Turn it Loose" by James Brown and "Get Ready" by Rare Earth. 

Due to the positive reception, DJs began isolating the percussive breaks, or small portions of a song, often without vocals, which were easy to dance to, of popular songs. DJ Kool Herc is known for generating the technique to produce these percussive breaks, which is known as merry-go-rounding. Merry-go-rounding when DJs would "use the two turntables in a typical DJ setup not as a way to make a smooth transition between two records, but as a way to switch back and forth repeatedly between two copies of the same record." 

The technique of percussive breaks was then common in Jamaican dub music, and was largely introduced into New York by immigrants from Jamaica and elsewhere in the Caribbean, including DJ Kool Herc, who is generally considered the father of hip-hop. Upon this, a technique known as Jamaican toasting, or the act of speaking over a beat which later became rapping, was introduced by DJ Kool Herc in the South Bronx at this point of time as well.

1520 Sedgwick Avenue, an apartment building in Morris Heights, is a long-time "haven for working-class families"; in 2010, The New York Times reported that it is the "accepted birthplace of hip hop." As hip-hop grew from throughout the Bronx, 1520 was a starting point where Clive Campbell, later known as DJ Kool Herc, presided over parties in the community room at a pivotal point in the genre's history. DJ Kool Herc is credited with helping to start hip hop and rap music at a house concert at 1520 Sedgwick Avenue on August 11, 1973. At the concert he was DJing and emceeing in the :recreation room of 1520 Sedgwick Avenue. Sources have noted that while 1520 Sedgwick Avenue was not the actual birthplace of hip-hop—the genre developed slowly in several places in the 1970s—it was verified to be the place where one of the pivotal and formative events occurred that spurred hip hop culture forward. During a rally to save the building, DJ Kool Herc said, "1520 Sedgwick is the Bethlehem of Hip-Hop culture."

Many dwellings in the South Bronx during the early 1970s lived in poverty or were part of gangs. One example of this is Afrika Bambaataa, a former member of the street gang, The Black Spades, who is now deemed as the god-father of hip-hop. As an effort to end the street violence within the South Bronx, Bambaataa created the Zulu Nation, which is a group founded on the concepts of "Peace, Love, Unity, Having Fun" instead of partaking in gang violence and unlawful activity. Jeff Chang quotes Bambaataa in his text Can't Stop Won't Stop: A History of the Hip-Hop Generation in a section where Chang is discussing why the Zulu Nation formed. The quote by Bambaataa on page 105 of the text states "we had to come up with something to get the order back." As seen within the film The Hip Hop Years: Part 1, hip-hop aided in keeping violence from forming on the streets of the South Bronx and eased tensions with the police within the area. People were creating art such as hip-hop music and dances at the block parties within the South Bronx, so the police did not have issues with it.

Not only was music a major component of hip-hop culture being formulated within the South Bronx during the 1970s, a break dancing or B-boying movement was being generated as well. After DJ Kool Herc and other DJs kept utilizing the break beat within their music, an abundance of people who were dancing normally, eventually hit the floor and began what is known as breakdancing. According to the documentary, The Freshest Kids: The History of the B-Boy, break dancing occurred "spontaneously" and consisted of more "sporadic" dance moves. Additionally, a Zulu king and hip-hop historian stated that the dance consisted of "bouncing around, pivoting, turning, twists frontsweeps...". Many who participated in this form of dance were members of crews, such as the Rock Steady Crew, the New York City Breakers and the Magnificent Force.

On July 5, 2007, 1520 Sedgwick Avenue was recognized by the New York State Office of Parks, Recreation and Historic Preservation as the "Birthplace of Hip-Hop."

Education 

The New York City Department of Education operates district public schools. Community School Districts 7, 8, 9, and 12 are located in the South Bronx. Among the public schools are charter schools. Success Academies Bronx 1, 2, and 3 are part of Success Academy Charter Schools. An elementary charter school, Academic Leadership Charter School, opened on 141st Street and Cypress Avenue. Area private schools include Cardinal Hayes High School, located at 650 Grand Concourse and All Hallows High School, located at 111 East 164th Street. Among the institutions of higher education, Hostos Community College of the City University of New York is located in Grand Concourse and 149th Street, ten blocks from Yankee Stadium.

The South Bronx is also home to both for-profit and nonprofit organizations that offer a range of professional training and other educational programs. East Side House Settlement has been in the Mott Haven neighborhood since 1963, serving families and children. Their mission is to use education as a means of economic empowerment. Per Scholas, for example, is a nonprofit organization that offers free professional certification training directed towards successfully passing CompTIA A+ and Network+ certification exams as a route to securing jobs and building careers. Per Scholas also works with a growing number of Title One South Bronx middle schools, their students, and their families to provide computer training and access.

Transportation 

Major highways include the Major Deegan Expressway (I-87); Cross Bronx Expressway (I-95); Bruckner Expressway (I-278); Triborough Bridge; Grand Concourse. A variety of New York City Subway services run through the South Bronx.

A South Bronx Greenway currently connects the South Bronx over the Bronx Kill to Randalls Island on a bike and pedestrian pathway known as the Bronx Connector.

In 2000, 77.3% of all households in New York's 15th congressional district, covering the South Bronx, did not own automobiles. Citywide, the percentage is only 55%.

Notable natives 

 Danny Aiello (1933–2019), actor
 Nate Archibald (born 1948), retired professional basketball player who spent 14 years playing in the NBA and was inducted into the Naismith Memorial Basketball Hall of Fame
 Aventura, Dominican-American bachata music group
 Afrika Bambaataa (born 1957), disc jockey, singer-songwriter and producer
 Swizz Beatz (born 1978), rapper, DJ and record producer
 Jellybean Benitez (born 1957), songwriter, DJ, remixer and music producer
A Boogie wit da Hoodie, rapper, raised in Highbridge, Bronx
 Cardi B, rapper, raised in Highbridge, Bronx
 Canibus, rapper
 Majora Carter, raised in Hunts Point, current resident of Hunts Point
 Willie Colón, salsa musician
 Bobby Darin, singer, musician, actor
 Dion DiMucci & the Belmonts
 Don DeLillo, novelist
 Rebel Diaz, rap group
 Ruben Diaz Jr.
 Tim Dog, rapper
 Kay Flock  (born 2003), rapper, raised in Highbridge, Bronx

 Fr. Stan Fortuna, ordained as a priest in the Bronx in 1990
 Harry Gibson
 Hank Greenberg (1911–1986), Hall of Fame baseball player
 Marcus Jansen (born 1968), urban/expressionist painter resided on Boynton Avenue near Soundview Park in the Boynton Apartments
 Bonnie Jenkins, Under Secretary of State for Arms Control and International Security Affairs
 Carlos Henriquez jazz bassist
 DJ Kool Herc, DJ, raised in the West Bronx
 Monique Holsey-Hyman, politician, social worker, and professor
 Ralph Lauren, fashion designer
 Tom Leykis (born 1956), radio personality
 Cuban Link, rapper, born in Cuba, raised in Morrisania
 Jennifer Lopez, raised in Castle Hill
 Bernard McGuirk, grew up in the South Bronx
 Drag-On, rapper, raised in Soundview
 Fat Joe, rapper, raised in Morrisania
 Grandmaster Flash, DJ, born in Barbados, raised in Morrisania
 KRS-One, rapper, originally from Brooklyn, raised in both Mott Haven and Soundview
 T La Rock, rapper
 Scott La Rock
 Remy Ma, rapper, raised in Castle Hill
 Sonia Manzano (born 1950), actress, screenwriter, author, speaker and singer-songwriter best known for her role on Sesame Street
 French Montana, rapper, born in Morocco, raised in Tremont
 Richard A. Muller, physicist
 Wes Moore, author
 Nine, rapper
 Al Pacino, born in East Harlem, raised in the South Bronx
 Murray Perahia, concert pianist and conductor
 Colin Powell, raised in Longwood
 Big Pun, rapper, born in Soundview, raised in Highbridge
 Alex Ramos, professional boxer
 Charles Nelson Reilly actor, comedian, director and drama teacher
 Hell Rell, rapper raised in Tremont
 Bobby Sanabria (born 1957), Multi-Grammy nominated Latin and jazz drummer, percussionist, composer, arranger, educator, bandleader
 Dolph Schayes, 12x All Star basketball player
 Richie Scheinblum (1942–2021), Major League Baseball All Star outfielder
 Sonia Sotomayor (born 1954), Associate Justice of the Supreme Court of the United States
 Tony Sunshine, R&B singer, raised in Soundview
 Leonard Susskind, theoretical physicist
 Neil deGrasse Tyson, astrophysicist, physical cosmologist, science communicator/educator
 Kemba Walker, NBA player, raised in Soundview
 Kerry Washington, actress
 Steven Weinberg (1933–2021), theoretical physicist
 Barry Wellman (born 1942), sociologist
 645AR, rapper, born and raised partly in the region and attended Hostos Community College

In popular culture

Movies
 Tenement, 1985
 Rumble in the Bronx, 1995
 1990: The Bronx Warriors, 1982
 Gloria, 1980
 Willie Dynamite, 1973
 Fort Apache, The Bronx, 1981
 Wanderers, The, 1979
 Wolfen, 1981
 Wild Style, 1983
 Beat Street, 1984
 South Bronx Heroes, 1985
 A Bronx Tale, 1993
 Marty, 1955

Music
 "South Bronx" by Boogie Down Productions
 "Jenny from the Block" by Jennifer Lopez featuring Styles P & Jadakiss

Television
 The Get Down, 2016- Netflix series

Literature
 Dropsie Avenue (1995), by Will Eisner. Dropsie Avenue is the third story in the A Contract With God trilogy of graphic novels set in a fictional South Bronx neighborhood.
 Amazing Grace: The Lives of Children and the Conscience of a Nation. (1995), by Jonathan Kozol. Awarded the Anisfield-Wolf Book Award in 1996.

See also 

 80 Blocks From Tiffany's

References

Notes

Further reading 

 Kozol, Jonathan (1995); Amazing Grace; Crown Publishers.

Pictorial works 
 
  (Pictorial work on historical social life and customs in the South Bronx)

External links 

 Walking tour of the Grand Concourse Boulevard-Cross Bronx Expy area

Neighborhoods in the Bronx
History of hip hop
History of the Bronx